Leaves in the Storm is a 1912 silent film short directed by  and  starring Lois Weber. It was produced by Rex Motion Picture Company and distributed by the then new Universal Film Manufacturing Company.

It is preserved at the Library of Congress

Cast
Phillips Smalley - Husband
Lois Weber - Wife
Cleo Ridgely -

References

External links
 Leaves in the Storm at IMDb.com

1913 films
American silent short films
Films directed by Lois Weber
American black-and-white films
1913 short films
1913 drama films
Silent American drama films
1910s American films